was a village located in Takashima District, Shiga Prefecture, Japan.

As of 2003, the village had an estimated population of 2,546 and a density of 15.36 persons per km2. The total area was 165.77 km2.

On January 1, 2005, Kutsuki, along with the towns of Takashima, Adogawa, Imazu, Makino and Shin'asahi (all from Takashima District), was merged to create the city of Takashima.

Dissolved municipalities of Shiga Prefecture
Takashima, Shiga